During the 1974–75 season, the Scottish football club :Aberdeen F.C. was placed fifth in the :Scottish First Division. The team reached the quarterfinal round of the :Scottish Cup.

Results

Scottish First Division

Final standings

Scottish League Cup

Group stage

Group 3 final table

Scottish Cup

Texaco Cup

References

Aberdeen F.C. seasons
Aberdeen
Aberdeen